Run for Something is a progressive American political organization dedicated to recruiting and supporting young candidates running for down-ballot office. Its mission is to get young progressive candidates from non-traditional backgrounds to run for and win state and local offices, and create a next generation slate of political candidates that will seek higher office in the future.  

It was founded on January 20, 2017 — the day of the inauguration of Donald Trump as president — by Amanda Litman, the email director of Hillary Clinton's 2016 U.S. presidential campaign, and Ross Morales Rocketto, a veteran of political campaigns.

In May 2017, political action organization Onward Together, founded by Clinton, selected Run for Something as one of its three primary partner organizations. In the 2017 Virginia elections, Run for Something-endorsed candidates won more than 40 percent of their races, almost four times the average for first-time candidates.

National Run for Office Day, to occur annually one week after Election Day, was created by Run for Something in 2017 to encourage more young progressives to run for office.

References 

Organizations established in 2017
United States political action committees
Progressive organizations in the United States
2017 establishments in the United States